Schistura tirapensis is a species of ray-finned fish, a stone loach, in the genus Schistura. It can be found in hill streams with pebble beds in the Tirap District in Arunachal Pradesh, India.

References

T
Fish described in 1990